Jake Lilley (born 20 July 1993) is an Australian competitive sailor. He competed at the 2016 Summer Olympics in Rio de Janeiro, in the men's Finn class. He came eighth overall and participated in the medal race.

In December 2019 Jake Lilley achieved 5th in the Finn Gold Cup (World Championships) at Royal Brighton Yacht Club in Melbourne and qualified Australia's entry position for the Finn Class to compete in 2020 Tokyo Summer Olympics. Lilley came seventh in the men's Finn class and therefore was not in medal contention. Detailed result.

References

External links

1993 births
Living people
Australian male sailors (sport)
Olympic sailors of Australia
Sailors at the 2016 Summer Olympics – Finn
Sailors at the 2020 Summer Olympics – Finn
21st-century Australian people